Up All Night is the debut studio album by Australian musician, Rob Mills released on 14 June 2004. The album peaked at number 21 on the ARIA Charts.

Making of the album
In 2003, Rob Mills rose to prominence as a contestant on Australian Idol, eventually placing fifth. Mills was signed to Sony BMG and recorded the album in the first half of 2004.

Track listing

Charts

Release history

References

2004 debut albums
Sony BMG albums
Rob Mills albums